Found footage is a cinematic technique in which all or a substantial part of the work is presented as if it were discovered film or video recordings. The events on screen are typically seen through the camera of one or more of the characters involved, often accompanied by their real-time, off-camera commentary. For added realism, the cinematography may be done by the actors themselves as they perform, and shaky camera work and naturalistic acting are routinely employed. The footage may be presented as if it were "raw" and complete or as if it had been edited into a narrative by those who "found" it.

The most common use of the technique is in horror films, such as Incantation, Cannibal Holocaust, The Blair Witch Project, Paranormal Activity, Diary of the Dead, REC, Cloverfield, and Trollhunter, where the footage is purported to be the only surviving record of the events, with the participants now missing or dead. It has also been used in science fiction (e.g., Chronicle, Project Almanac, Europa Report), drama (e.g., Zero Day, Exhibit A), comedy (e.g., Project X), mystery (e.g., Searching), and family (e.g., Earth to Echo) films.

Although found footage was originally the name of an entirely different genre, it is now frequently used to describe pseudo-documentaries crafted with this narrative technique. The film magazine Variety has, for example, used the term "faux found-footage film" to describe some titles. Film scholar David Bordwell criticizes this recent usage, arguing that it sows confusion, and instead prefers the term "discovered footage" for the narrative gimmick.

Characteristics 
Found-footage films typically employ one or more of four cinematic techniques—first-person perspective, pseudo-documentary or mockumentary, news footage, or surveillance footage—according to an analysis of 500 found-footage films conducted by Found Footage Critic.

History 
As a plot device, found footage has precedents in literature, particularly in the epistolary novel, which typically consists of either correspondence or diary entries, purportedly written by a character central to the events. Like found footage, the epistolary technique has often been employed in horror fiction: both Dracula and Frankenstein are epistolary novels, as is The Call of Cthulhu by H. P. Lovecraft.

In filmmaking, the 1980 cult horror feature Cannibal Holocaust is often claimed to be the first example of found footage.  However, the Orson Welles directed The Other Side of the Wind, a found footage movie shot in the early 1970s but released in 2018, predates Cannibal Holocaust.  The device was popularised by The Blair Witch Project (1999). Found footage has since been used in other commercially successful films, including Paranormal Activity (2007), REC (2007), Cloverfield (2008) and Chronicle (2012). Reviewing V/H/S for The A.V. Club, Scott Tobia notes that the genre "has since become to the '00s and '10s what slasher movies were to the '80s."

The genre appeals to film producers because of its lower cost, as it is believed the illusion of amateur documentary style allows lower production values than would be accepted on a conventional film.

Writer-director Christopher B. Landon, who has made several found footage horror films, posits that the genre is likely to extend in the future outside horror.

Examples

Films 

The following entries are notable films in the found footage genre, though some were only partially made in that style.
{| class="wikitable sortable"
|-
! Title 
! Release year
! Director(s)
! Production company
! class=unsortable | 
|-
| The Connection
| 1961
| Shirley Clarke
| The Connection Company
|
|-
| Coming Apart
| 1969
| Milton Moses Ginsberg
| Kaleidoscope Films
|
|-
| Cannibal Holocaust
| 1980
| Ruggero Deodato
| F.D. Cinematografica
|
|-
| Special Bulletin
| 1983
| Edward Zwick
| Ohlmeyer Communications Company
|
|-
| Guinea Pig: Devil's Experiment
| 1985
| Satoru Ogura
| Sai Enterprise
|
|-
| UFO Abduction
| 1989
| Dean Alioto
| IndieSyndicate Productions
|
|-
| 84C MoPic
| 1989
| Patrick Sheane Duncan
| New Century Vista Film Company
|
|-
| Man Bites Dog
| 1993
| Rémy BelvauxAndré BonzelBenoît Poelvoorde
| Les Artistes Anonymes
|
|-
| Forgotten Silver
| 1995
| Peter Jackson
| WingNut Films
|
|-
| Alien Abduction: Incident in Lake County
| 1998
|  Dean Alioto
| Dick Clark Productions
|
|-
| The Last Broadcast
| 1998
| Stefan AvalosLance Weiler
| FFM Productions
|
|-
| The Blair Witch Project
| 1999
| Daniel MyrickEduardo Sánchez
| Haxan Films
|
|-
| The St. Francisville Experiment
| 2000
| Ted Nicolaou
| The Kushner-Locke Company
|
|-
| Gang Tapes
| 2001
| Adam Ripp
| Lionsgate
|
|-
| August Underground
| 2001
| Fred Vogel
| Absu FilmsToetag Pictures
|
|-
| The Collingswood Story
| 2002
| Mike Costanza
| Cinerebel Media
|
|-
| August Underground's Mordum
| 2003
| Fred Vogel Killjoy Cristie Whiles Jerami Cruise Michael T. Schneider
| Toetag Pictures
|
|-
| The Great American Snuff Film
| 2003
| Sean Tretta 
| Ominous Productions
|
|-
|The Last Horror Movie
| 2003
| Julian Richards
| Prolific FilmsSnakehair Productions
|
|-
| Zero Day
| 2003
| Ben Coccio
| Professor Bright Films
|
|-
| Incident at Loch Ness
| 2004
| Zak Penn
| Eden Rock Media
|
|-
| September Tapes
| 2004
| Christian Johnston
| Complex Films Raz Productions Raz Entertainment Persistent Entertainment
|
|-
| Noroi: The Curse
| 2005
| Kōji Shiraishi
| Xanadeux Company
|
|-
| Alone with Her
| 2006
| Eric Nicholas
| Pin Hole Productions LLCThe Weinstein Company
|
|-
| The Zombie Diaries
| 2006
| Kevin GatesMichael Bartlett
| Off World FilmsBleeding Edge Films
|
|-
| State's Evidence
| 2006
| Benjamin Louis
| Terra Entertainment
|
|-
| The Hunt
| 2007
| Fritz Kiersch
| Graymark Productions Azisa Pictures
|
|-
| Welcome to the Jungle
| 2007
| Jonathan Hensleigh
| Steelbridge Film Works Bauer Martinez Studios Valhalla Motion Pictures
|
|-
| The Poughkeepsie Tapes
| 2007
| John Erick Dowdle
| Brothers Dowdle ProductionsPoughkeepsie Films
|
|-
| August Underground's Penance
| 2007
| Fred Vogel
| Toetag Pictures
|
|-
|Redacted
| 2007
| Brian De Palma
| Magnolia Pictures
|
|-
| Long Pigs
| 2007
| Chris Power
| Clowns After Midnight Productions Jordan Entertainment Chris Bridges Effects Studio
|
|-
| Head Case
| 2007
| Anthony Spadaccini
| Fleet Street Films B.P.A. Productions Group, Inc.
|
|-
| Exhibit A
| 2007
| Dom Rotheroe
| Warp Films
|
|-
| Paranormal Activity
| 2007
| Oren Peli
| Blumhouse Productions
|
|-
| Death of a Ghost Hunter
| 2007
| Sean Tretta
| Ominous Productions
|
|-
| Live!
| 2007
| Bill Guttentag
| Atlas Entertainment
|
|-
| REC
| 2007
| Jaume BalagueróPaco Plaza
| Castelao ProduccionesFilmax
|
|-
| Look
| 2007
| Adam Rifkin
| Captured Films
|
|-
| Monster
| 2008
| Erik Estenberg
| The Asylum
|
|-
| Cloverfield
| 2008
| Matt Reeves
| Bad Robot Productions
|
|-
| Diary of the Dead
| 2008
| George A. Romero
| Artfire FilmsRomero-Grunwald Productions
|
|-
|Lake Mungo
| 2008
| Joel Anderson
| Screen Australia
|
|-
| Home Movie
| 2008
| Christopher Denham
| Modernciné
|
|-
| Bryan Loves You
| 2008
| Seth Landau
| Seth Landau
|
|-
| Quarantine
| 2008
| John Erick Dowdle
| Vertigo EntertainmentAndale Pictures Filmax Entertainment
|
|-
| No Through Road
| 2009
| Steven Chamberlain
|
| 
|-
| Occult
| 2009
| Kōji Shiraishi
| Image Rings Creative Axa Company Ltd.
|
|-
| Evil Things
| 2009
| Dominic Perez
| Go Show Media
|
|-
| District 9
| 2009
| Neill Blomkamp
| QED International WingNut Films
|
|-
| The Ritual
| 2009
| Anthony Spadaccini
| Fleet Street Films B.P.A. Productions Group, Inc.
|
|-
| Trash Humpers
| 2009
| Harmony Korine
| Alcove Entertainment  Warp Films  O' Salvation
|
|-
| REC 2
| 2009
| Jaume BalagueróPaco Plaza
| Castelao ProduccionesFilmax
|
|-
| Murder Collection V.1
| 2009
| Fred Vogel
| Toetag Pictures
| 
|-
| Paranormal Entity
| 2009
| Shane Van Dyke
| The Asylum
|
|-
| Bachiatari Bōryoku Ningen
| 2010
| Kōji Shiraishi
| Creative AXA
|
|-
| Lunopolis
| 2010
| Matthew Avant
| Media Savant
|
|-
| Love Sex aur Dhokha
| 2010
| Dibakar Banerjee
| Freshwater Films
|
|-
| Eyes in the Dark
| 2010
| Bjorn Anderson
| Emerald City Pictures
|
|-
| Hotel Hollywood
| 2010
| Param Gill
| G S Productions
|
|-
| Shirome
| 2010
| Kōji Shiraishi
| Stardust Promotion Shirome Project Partners
|
|-
| The Last Exorcism
| 2010
| Daniel Stamm
| Strike EntertainmentStudioCanalArcade Pictures
|
|-
| Undocumented
| 2010
| Chris Peckover
| Sheperd Glen Productions
|
|-
| The Virginity Hit
| 2010
| Huck Botko & Andrew Gurland
| Gary Sanchez Productions
|
|-
| 8213: Gacy House
| 2010
| Anthony Fankhauser
| The Asylum
|
|-
| Atrocious
| 2010
| Fernando Barreda Luna
| Nabu Films Silencio Rodamos Programa Ibermedia
|
|-
| Paranormal Activity 2
| 2010
| Tod Williams
| Blumhouse Productions
|
|-
| Trollhunter
| 2010
| André Øvredal
| Filmkameratene A/SFilm Fund FUZZ
|
|-
| Unaware
| 2010
| Sean Bardin Robert Cooley
| Cooley Productions
|
|-
| Paranormal Activity 2: Tokyo Night
| 2010
| Toshikazu Nagae
| Presidio Corporation
|
|-
| Anneliese: The Exorcist Tapes
| 2011
| Jude Gerard Prest
| The Asylum
|
|-
| Ragini MMS
| 2011
| Pawan Kripalani
| Balaji Telefilms
|
|-
| The Tunnel
| 2011
| Carlo Ledesma
| DLSHS Film Distracted Media Zapruder's Other Films
|
|-
| Megan Is Missing
| 2011
| Michael Goi
| Trio Pictures
|
|-
| Grave Encounters
| 2011
| The Vicious Brothers
| Twin Engine Films
|
|-
| World of the Dead: The Zombie Diaries
| 2011
| Kevin GatesMichael Bartlett
| Off World FilmsBleeding Edge FilmsStraightwire Films
|
|-
| Hollow
| 2011
| Michael Axelgaard
| Hollow PicturesTribeca Film
|
|-
| Untitled
| 2011
| Shaun Troke
| Shaunywa Films
|
|-
| Apollo 18
| 2011
| Gonzalo López-Gallego
| Bazelevs
|
|-
| The Tapes
| 2011
| Scott Bates Lee Alliston
| Darkside Pictures Pure Film Productions
|-
| Paranormal Activity 3
| 2011
| Henry JoostAriel Schulman
| Blumhouse
|
|-
| The Amityville Haunting
| 2011
| Geoff Meed
| The AsylumTaut Productions
|
|-
| Chō Akunin
| 2011
| Kōji Shiraishi
| Tokyo Raiders
|
|-
| The Devil Inside
| 2012
| William Brent Bell
| Insurge Pictures
|
|-
| V/H/S
| 2012
| Ti West Joe Swanberg David Buckner Adam Wingard Glenn McQuaid
| Radio Silence Productions The CollectiveBloody Disgusting
|
|-
| Chronicle
| 2012
| Josh Trank
| Davis Entertainment
|
|-
| Project X
| 2012
| Nima Nourizadeh
| Silver PicturesGreen Hat Films
|
|-
| Evidence
| 2012
| Howie Askins
| RynoRyder Productions
|
|-
| Hate Crime
| 2013
| James Cullen Bressack
| Psykik Junky Pictures
|
|-
| Apartment 143
| 2012
| Carles Torrens
| Werc Werk WorksKasdan PicturesLikely Story
|
|-
| 100 Ghost Street: The Return of Richard Speck
| 2012
| Martin Anderson
| The Asylum
|
|-
| The Dinosaur Project
| 2012
| Sid Bennett
| Moonlighting Films
|
|-
| A Night in the Woods
| 2012
| Richard Parry
| Vertigo Films
|
|-
| End of Watch
| 2012
| David Ayer
| StudioCanal
|
|-
| The Conspiracy
| 2012
| Christopher MacBride
| Resolute Films and Entertainment
|
|-
| Grave Encounters 2
| 2012
| John Poliquin
| Arclight Films
|
|-
| Paranormal Activity 4
| 2012
| Henry Joost Ariel Schulman
| Room 101
|
|-
| The Bay
| 2012
| Barry Levinson
| Lionsgate
|
|-
| A Haunted House
| 2013
| Michael Tiddes
| Open Road Films
|
|-
| The Upper Footage
| 2013
| Justin Cole
|
|
|-
| Dabbe: Curse of the Jinn
| 2013
| Hasan Karacadağ
| Hasan Karacadağ
|
|-
| Devil's Pass
| 2013
| Renny Harlin
| Aldamisa EntertainmentNon-Stop ProductionsMidnight Sun PicturesK. Jam Media
|
|-
| The Frankenstein Theory
| 2013
| Andrew Weiner
| RocketInner StationTherapy ContentArctic Film Group
||
|-
| Cult
| 2013
| Kōji Shiraishi
|
|
|-
| Willow Creek
| 2013
| Bobcat Goldthwait
| Jerkschool Productions
|
|-
| V/H/S/2
| 2013
| Simon BarrettJason EisenerGareth EvansGregg HaleEduardo SánchezTimo TjahjantoAdam Wingard
| The CollectiveBloody Disgusting8383 ProductionsSnoot EntertainmentHaxan FilmsYer Dead Productions
|
|-
| Europa Report
| 2013
| Sebastián Cordero
| Wayfare Entertainment Ventures
|
|-
| The Borderlands
| 2013
| Elliot Goldner
| Metrodome Distribution
|
|-
| The Paranormal Diaries: Clophill
| 2013
| Kevin GatesMichael Bartlett
| Second Sight Films
|
|-
| Head Cases: Serial Killers in the Delaware Valley
| 2013
| Anthony Spadaccini
| Fleet Street Films B.P.A. Productions Group, Inc.
|
|-
| The Dirties
| 2013
| Matt Johnson
| SModcast Pictures
|
|-
| Sx Tape
| 2013
| Bernard Rose
| AeroplanoLa.Lune Entertainment
|
|-
| Hooked Up
| 2013
| Pablo Larcuen
| Uncork'd Entertainment
|
|-
| Skinwalker Ranch
| 2013
| Devin McGinnSteve Berg
| DeepStudios
|
|-
| 6-5=2
| 2013
| KS Ashoka
| Swarnalatha Production
| 
|-
| Best Night Ever
| 2013
| Jason Friedberg and Aaron Seltzer
| Magnet Releasing
|
|-
| Paranormal Activity: The Marked Ones
| 2014
| Christopher Landon
| Paramount Pictures
|
|-
| Devil's Due
| 2014
| Matt Bettinelli-OlpinTyler Gillett
| Davis Entertainment Twentieth Century Fox Film Corporation
|
|-
| Black Water Vampire
| 2014
| Evan Tramel
| BWV ProductionsRuthless Pictures
|
|-
| Exists
| 2014
| Eduardo Sánchez
| LionsgateHaxan FilmsCourt Five
|
|-
| Open Windows
| 2014
| Nacho Vigalondo
| Antena 3 FilmsApaches EntertainmentSpiderwood StudiosWild BunchSpectreVision
|
|-
| The Den
| 2014
| Zachary Donohue
| Cliffbrook FilmsOnset Films
|
|-
| Afflicted
| 2014
| Derek LeeClif Prowse
| Automatik EntertainmentTéléfilm Canada
|
|-
| Babysitting
| 2014
| Nicolas BenamouPhilippe Lacheau
| Axel FilmsMadame FilmsCinéfrance 1888Good Lap Production
|
|-
| A Haunted House 2
| 2014
| Michael Tiddes
| IM Global OctaneWayans Bros. EntertainmentBaby Way Productions
|
|-
| The Sacrament'
| 2014
| Ti West
| Worldview EntertainmentArcade Pictures
|
|-
| Alien Abduction| 2014
| Matty Beckerman
| Exclusive Media GroupBig PictureNext EntertainmentLawrence Bender ProductionsMob Scene Creative Productions
|
|-
| Inner Demons| 2014
| Seth Grossman
| Schorr Pictures
|
|-
| Earth to Echo| 2014
| Dave Green
| Relativity Media
|
|-
| Into the Storm| 2014
| Steven Quale
| New Line CinemaVillage Roadshow Pictures
|
|-
| The Possession of Michael King| 2014
| David Jung
| Gold Circle FilmsQuickfire Films
|
|-
| As Above, So Below| 2014
| John Erick Dowdle
| Universal PicturesLegendary Pictures
|
|-
| The Hunted| 2014
| Josh Stewart
| Fortress FeaturesAllegheny Image Factory
|
|-
| Gore, Quebec| 2014
| Jean Benoit Lauzon
| Green Lake Films
| 
|-
| The Taking of Deborah Logan| 2014
| Adam Robitel
| Eagle FilmsMillennium Entertainment
|
|-
| Hangar 10| 2014
| Daniel Simpson
| Newscope Films
|
|-
| V/H/S: Viral| 2014
| Nacho VigalondoMarcel SarmientoGregg BishopJustin BensonTodd Lincoln
| Bloody DisgustingThe CollectiveHaxan Films
|
|-
| The Pyramid| 2014
| Grégory Levasseur
| Twentieth Century Fox Film Corporation
|
|-
| The Atticus Institute| 2015
| Chris Sparling
| SND Groupe M6
|
|-
| Project Almanac| 2015
| Dean Israelite
| Insurge PicturesPlatinum DunesMTV Films
|
|-
| Ghoul| 2015
| Petr Jákl Jr.
| J.B.J Film
|
|-
| Creep| 2015
| Patrick Brice
| Blumhouse Productions
|
|-
| Nightlight| 2015
| Scott Beck, Bryan Woods
| Herrick Entertainment
| 
|-
| The Final Project| 2015
| Taylor Ri'chard
| Cavu Pictures
| 
|-
| Unfriended| 2015
| Levan Gabriadze
| Universal StudiosBlumhouse Productions
|
|-
| Area 51| 2015
| Oren Peli
| Paramount Pictures
|
|-
| The Phoenix Incident| 2015
| Keith Arem
| PCB Productions
|
|-
| The Cutting Room| 2015
| Warren Dudley
| Itchy Fish Film
|
|-
| The Gallows| 2015
| Travis Cluff, Chris Lofing
| New Line CinemaBlumhouse ProductionsManagement 360Tremendum Pictures
|
|-
| JeruZalem| 2015
| Doron PazYoav Paz
| Universal Pictures
|
|-
| The Visit| 2015
| M. Night Shyamalan
| Blinding Edge PicturesBlumhouse ProductionsUniversal Pictures
|
|-
| Hell House LLC| 2015
| Stephen Cognetti
| Cognetti Films
|
|-
| Paranormal Activity: The Ghost Dimension| 2015
| Gregory Plotkin
| Paramount Pictures
|
|-
| Unlisted Owner| 2016
| Jed Brian
| Lawford County Productions
|
|-
| Aksbandh| 2016
| Emran Hussain
| Cinematic Media
|
|-
| Population Zero| 2016
| Adam Levins
| A71 Entertainment
|
|-
| Operation Avalanche| 2016
| Matt Johnson
| Vice Films
|
|-
| Blair Witch| 2016
| Adam Wingard
| Lionsgate Pictures
|
|-
| Be My Cat: A Film for Anne| 2016
| Adrian Țofei
| Adrian Țofei
|
|-
| The Lost Case| 2017
| Chayan Itthijatuporn
| Kantana Group
|
|-
| The Dark Tapes| 2017
| Michael McQuown
| Epic Pictures Group
|
|-
| Phoenix Forgotten| 2017
| Justin Barber
| Cinelou FilmsScott Free Productions
|
|-
| #FromJennifer| 2017
| Frank Merle
| Lone Morsel Productions
|
|-
| Found Footage 3D| 2017
| Steven DeGennaro
| The Ubiquitous Studio 42
|
|-
| Unfriended: Dark Web| 2018
| Stephen Susco
| BH ProductionsUniversal Studios
|
|-
| The Devil's Doorway| 2018
| Aislinn Clarke
| 23ten
|
|-
| The Other Side of the Wind| 2018
| Orson Welles
| Royal Road Entertainment
|
|-
| Searching| 2018
| Aneesh Chaganty
| Bazelevs CompanyScreen GemsStage 6 Films
|
|-
| And Then It Goes Dark| 2019
| Austin Cook
| Virmedius
|
|-
| Insanity
| 2020
| Miska Kajanus
| Piilo ProductionsBlack Lion Pictures
| 
|-
| Hacksaw
| 2020
| Anthony Leone
| Leone Films
|
|-
| Host
| 2020
| Rob Savage
| Shadowhouse FilmsShudder
|
|-
| Spree| 2020
| Eugene Kotlyarenko
| RLJE Films
|
|-
| Scary Stories: Dark Web| 2020
| Bryan Renaud
| Random Acts
|
|-
| The Widow
| 2020
| Ivan Minin
| QS Films
|
|-
| The Medium
| 2021
| Banjong Pisanthanakun
| GDH 559Showbox
|
|-
| Vazhiye| 2021
| Nirmal Baby Varghese
| Casablanca Film Factory
|
|-
| The Novel Haunting| 2021
| Austin Cook
| Virmedius
|
|-
| V/H/S/94| 2021
| Jennifer ReederChloe OkunoSimon BarrettTimo TjahjantoRyan Prows
| Radio Silence ProductionsBloody Disgusting FilmsShudder Original FilmsCinepocalypse ProductionsStudio71Raven Banner Entertainment
|
|-
| Dwellers| 2021
| Drew Fortier
| Ellefson Films
|
|-
| Paranormal Activity: Next of Kin| 2021
| William Eubank
| Paramount Pictures
|
|-
| Incantation| 2022
| Kevin Ko
|
|
|-
| Dashcam
| 2022
| Rob Savage
| Blumhouse Productions
|
|-
| The Outwaters| 2022
| Robbie Banfitch
| 5100 FilmsFathom Film Company
| 
|-
|  LOLA| 2022
| Andrew Legge
|
|
|-
| Everybody Dies by the End| 2022
| Ian Tripp, Ryan Schafer
|
|
|-
|  VIRAL: a scary story| 2022
| Bryan Renaud
| Random Acts
|
|-
| V/H/S/99| 2022
| Johannes RobertsVanessa & Joseph WinterMaggie LevinTyler MacIntyreFlying Lotus
| Shudder (streaming service)
|
|-
|}

 TV series, made-for-TV specials and TV episodes 
 Alternative 3 (1977)
 Ghostwatch (1992)
 Alien Autopsy: (Fact or Fiction?) (1995)
 Alien Abduction: Incident in Lake County (1998) – UPN aired a 60-minute version with more interviews
 Godzilla: The Series, episode: "S.C.A.L.E." (2000). Though animated, the episode has no background music and alternates between footage from various security cameras.
 Jeopardy (2002) (BBC series)
 Ed, Edd n Eddy, episode: "An Ed is Born" In this episode where Eddy decides to make a home movie of himself to show his brother how 'grown up' he has become by using Ed's video camera. (2002)
 The Comeback (2003) (series)
 Flag (2006)
 Lost Tapes (2008–2010) (series)
 Marble Hornets (2009–2014) (YouTube series)
 The River (2012) (series)
 The Simpsons, episode: Treehouse of Horror XXIII (2012) The 2nd segment "Unnormal Activity" is a parody of the Paranormal Activity franchise.
 Ultimate Spider-Man, episode: "Exclusive" (2012)
 Lassie Jerky, an episode of Psych that was partially filmed as found footage (2013)
 Sleep No More, the ninth episode of Doctor Who Series 9 (2015)
 American Horror Story: Roanoke (2016) (FX series)
 Steven Universe, episode: "The Big Show" (2018)
 Inside No. 9, episode: "Cold Comfort", a story about a call centre, told through the CCTV Camera. (2018)
 Clarence, episode: "Clarence The Movie" (2018)

 Music videos 
 "Drag the Waters" by Pantera (1996)
 "Babalon A.D." by Cradle of Filth (2003)
 "Decency Defied" by Cannibal Corpse (2004)
 "Walk with Me in Hell" by Lamb of God (2006)
 "Dull Boy" by Mudvayne (2007)
 "Beauty and a Beat" by Justin Bieber ft. Nicki Minaj (2012)
 "I Need Your Love" by Calvin Harris ft. Ellie Goulding (2012)
 "Run on Love" by Tove Lo ft. Lucas Nord (2013)
 "One Last Time" by Ariana Grande (2015)
 "Photograph" by Ed Sheeran (2015)
 "Run Away with Me" by Carly Rae Jepsen (2015)
 "All Night" by The Vamps (2016)
 "All We Know" by The Chainsmokers ft. Phoebe Ryan (2016)
 "Galway Girl" by Ed Sheeran (2017)
 "What Lovers Do"  by Maroon 5 ft. SZA (2017)
 "Christmas Tree Farm" by Taylor Swift (2019)
 "Nobody's Love" by Maroon 5 (2022)
 "Glimpse of Us" by Joji (2022)

 Web series 
 The Backrooms (2019–present)
 Kane Pixels' The Backrooms (2022–present)
 Ben Drowned (2010–2012; 2020)
 Local 58 (2015–present)
 Petscop No Through Road (2009–2012)
 Marble Hornets (2009–2014)
 Mandela Catalogue The Walten Files Gemini Home Entertainment (2019–present)
 hiimmarymary'' (2016–2020)

See also 
 Analog horror
 Cinéma vérité
 Epistolary novel
 Hoax
 Mockumentary
 Pseudo-documentary
 Screenlife

Notes

References

External links 
 Found Footage Critic – found footage film database

 
Narrative techniques
Plot (narrative)
Documentaries
Documentary film genres
1960s in film
1980s in film
1990s in film
2000s in film
2010s in film
2020s in film
Horror films